is a Japanese children's manga series created by , serialized in Kodansha's Comic BomBom magazine. The series would debut its first chapter in September 1997, later releasing eleven volumes of manga compilations between 1998 and 2002 with each manga covering a particular story arch from the Comic Bombom series. It centers on the titular character, a housecat who is kidnapped and modified by a mad scientist to be a part of a cyborg army bent on world domination. Kuro breaks his control chip, escapes and becomes a vigilante. Kuro has many allies, who help him out during instances such as urban destruction, parallel universes, outer space, and battles between other cats and cyborgs.

Cyborg Kuro-chan was adapted into an anime series produced by Studio Bogey for TV Tokyo. The anime aired in TV Tokyo and its affiliates from 2 October 1999 to 6 January 2001 for 66 episodes. The manga and anime have been exported to several countries in Asia, Europe, and Africa. An English dub aired on Animax and the first 14 episodes of the dub were released on VCD. A large number of merchandise has been made based on the manga and anime, and two additional volumes, entitled Cyborg Kuro-chan: Extra Battle, were published. Reviews for the series note the simplistic and cartoonish art style, and a thin storyline which is mainly centered on gags and comedic violence.

Story 
Kuro is a housecat for an old couple who cannot defend themselves and are in frequent danger. They rely on him to keep burglars from invading their house, at which he is skilled. Despite his courage, he is in love with the neighborhood dog, Pooly, and he sets out to confess this one day. While heading to see her, he and Pooly are ambushed and injured. Kuro is then kidnapped by Dr. Go, a mad scientist, and transformed into a cyborg with invincible steel frames and unlimited strength, the latest in a line of robot cats used for world domination, called the "Nyan-Nyan Army". He somehow, though, breaks a chip supposedly used to control him, and he escapes Go's laboratory as well as destroying it, while he now realizes that he is now bipedal and can speak human language. He comes to terms with his predicament, while maintaining his lifestyle as an average housecat. However, Go feels that Kuro is ungrateful to him, and he and the Nyan-Nyan Army, including the most well-known Mi, set out to find and kill him, though they eventually surrender and decide to live a more peaceful life.

Often, Kuro will save his owners and the city from trouble. He has multiple adversaries, including Go's Nyan-Nyan Army. Dr. Go and Mi help Kuro out in the toughest situations. Throughout the course of the series, there are phantasmal and extraordinary predicaments that Kuro and his friends must solve.

Characters

Main 
 - The main character who was kidnapped by Dr. Go and turned into a cyborg cat, along with various features and weapons. Though he has a horrible temper, appears unenthusiastic about helping others, and gets angry and out of control easily, he is good-hearted and cares for others more than he lets on. Despite being the hero, he frequently shows un-heroic behavior such as using Romeo as a weapon or at times dragging others into trouble because he feels like it and likes to rampage for comedic effect. He uses a Gatling gun as a signature weapon. He is usually seen sleeping on the veranda of his owner's house. He was named  as a kitten before being adopted by his owners. Kuro is voiced by Chika Sakamoto.

 - The main antagonist and a major antihero, an eccentric inventor who wishes world domination by creating cyborg cats as weapons of mass destruction. His plan completely backfired when Kuro took away the control chip and through sheer willpower of his own. He later stops from his plans in world domination and decides to live in a more peaceful way of living with Mi and later Kotaro. Although Kuro and his relationship is turbulent and hostile at times, Kuro does respects him as an inventor. His real name is
 Dr. Go is voiced by Tōru Furusawa.

 - A cyborg cat created by Dr. Go to at first save his life and later aid him in dominating the world. He appears as a frequent "goon" of his but is in fact kind-hearted and noble. At a later part of the story where Go accepts defeat and turns down on his conquest to world domination, he is now often seen helping him and in times helping Kuro too. Though they are more friendly rivals now, Mi and Kuro will often get into fights which are sometimes instigated by Mi himself. Although he is usually kind he, like Kuro, has a fierce temper when pushed. Opposite to Kuro, Mi prefers a sword as his standard weapon. With the Devil Chip, he can fuse himself to any weapon and create additional items to them. He is also a great cook. Mi is voiced by Chiharu Tezuka.,

- A regular tabby cat who wears a red tattered "cloak" and has an eyepatch over his right eye. He was a childhood friend of Kuro, but he declared himself his enemy after a tussle leads to him losing his eye. He has an arsenal of weapons he hides in his cloak with his main weapon being a wooden boomerang which he can use to hit targets at great distances or a chainsaw. Though he is serious, he can be quite lazy and gluttonous with little self-control at times and sometimes needs to be forced by Kuro into helping. He is also skilled in craftsmanship and an experienced carpenter. He is the only one to refer to Kuro as Kid. Matatabi is voiced by Makiko Ohmoto.

- A boy genius dressed in a cat suit who helps Dr. Go and Mi out by assisting in their inventions or building his own. He has an obsession over Kuro, and tries to prove to be as powerful as him. This idea of his was the result of being an outcast. He is experienced in technology, with an IQ of 200. The reviewer for Manga-News describes Kotaro as walling himself into his world of video games, but also regards Kotaro as an author surrogate. Kotaro is voiced by Rika Komatsu.

- A female android with a rabbit-like appearance that was created by Kotaro from a table lamp. She develops a love interest in Kuro, who denies her; she accepts his rejection after numerous attempts to win his heart, though it is shown that he does care for her. She is also great at Knitting and often knits a scarf to Kuro. Nana is voiced by Hiromi Tsunakake.

Supporting 
 - The elderly couple who treat Kuro as a companion. They are not immune to trouble, never learn much, and are in need of Kuro's rescue frequently. However, they have no idea that Kuro is now a cyborg, though he intends to keep this secret.
They are voiced by Junichi Sugawara and Satomi Korogi respectively.

 - A schoolteacher who also admires Kuro. He is an avid otaku, and often gets himself involved into Kuro's shenanigans. Suzuki is portrayed by Toshiyuki Morikawa.

 - A female firefighter who is Suzuki's crush. She is a quick thinker in most situations, such as putting out even the least dangerous of fires in her debut appearance in the anime. In the manga, Megumi was portrayed as an otaku like Suzuki but was toned down in the anime. Megumi is portrayed by Sayuri Yoshida.

 and  - A duo of alien robot lovers. They are very optimistic, no matter what happens. They later marry and have a child together. Romeo is voiced by Kosuke Okano, while Juliet is voiced by Sayuri Yoshida.

 - Kotaro's robot lion friend. He was an ordinary lion, but he was involved in a near-death experience. Dr. Go successfully revived him in his current cyborg form. Later on in the series Dunk gets modified by Kotaro's father who gives him the ability to speak using text boxes appear out of his head. Dunk is quite timid, gentle, and pure.  He is voiced by Isshin Chiba.

 - A girl with a deep hatred for Kuro and very powerful supernatural abilities, including ESP and telekinesis. Another notable feature of hers is her voluminous hair.

 - A boy Chieko met on a camping trip who came from an abusive household. He is a big dreamer, but he is a loser. He boasts a large scar from his abuse. He ends up being temporarily turned into a cyborg after being gravely injured with Cheiko attempting to teach him how to be human again. Goro only appeared in the manga.

Antagonists 
His face is comically huge but has a very short stature. Like Dr. Go, he specializes in cyborg technology but with dogs which were powerful. He made only one appearance in the anime but made another in the manga as a security warden of a large prison. He also appears as the antagonist of the 2nd game and made a cyborg called BB, which looks just like Kuro. He is voiced by Isshin Chiba

 - The rival of Doctor Go in the past as students and the guy responsible for the demise of Mi's mother. Unlike Go whose allies are cats and specializes in robot technology, Tendou prefers to use dogs and is proficient in genetic engineering and modified his dog  who went around killing cats like Mi's mother on his command. He makes a reappearance in the anime years later where he attempts to use Kotaro's robotic knowledge to get revenge on Doctor Go. He is voiced by Naoki Tatsuta.

 - A squadron of cyborg cats created by Dr. Go. Mi is the first in the line, created by Go from the remains of his pet kitten. There are four other remaining members who used to be strays taken care of by Go in his younger days before being gravely injured by a fire - #2, nicknamed Spyder, who can expand his arms, legs, and neck, #3, who also fights with his own sword and boasts a panda disguise, #4, who also has a bad temper and has a fierce hatred of Kuro for ruining Dr. Go's plans and humiliating him several times, and #5, who is seen with a robot companion, Lassie, and also uses a Gatling gun. #2 is voiced by Yuko Sasamoto, #3 is voiced by Rika Komatsu, #4 is voiced by Sayuri Yoshida and #5 is voiced by Mami Nakajima.

Others 
 is one of Suzuki's class representative. Despite being a class representative, he skips classes and makes a fool of Suzuki like other students. Along with Satoko, they appear a lot out of the other students and sometimes come along on adventures. He is voiced by Rika Komatsu.

 is one of Suzuki's class representatives. As a class representative, she is kind and takes her responsibilities serious and kindly guided Chieko who had just transferred, around the town. Like Kazuma, they appear a lot out of the other students and sometimes come along on adventures. She is voiced by Yuko Sasamoto.

 - A trio of friendly aliens that boast incredibly dangerous weapons. They are often also seen wearing special bracelets that can enlarge or shrink their targets. The aliens are anime-original characters.

 - An alien princess who closely resembles Nana. Malo was supposed to marry her, but she refused and ran away. Despite her ladylike looks, she is actually quite selfish, she only appears in the anime and is voiced by Hiromi Tsunakake.

 - An alien prince of the YaYaYa group. He bears a striking resemblance to Kuro. Malo is supposed to be courteous and he has the opposite personality from Kuro, but he eats like a vampire, and he also boasts offensive British gas, he only appears in the anime and is voiced by Chika Sakamoto

 - A caricature of the manga's creator, Naoki Yokouchi. He makes fleeting appearances in some anime episodes. He is depicted wearing a purple trenchcoat with a similarly colored hat.

 - A stray pink poodle who was Kuro's crush in the beginning of the series. In the anime version, she lived in a house but moved away. She is voiced by Yuko Sasamoto.

  - Mi's first love. She was abandoned by her owner and lived as a stray for a brief time before being adopted by a girl she had saved from an accident. She is voiced by Yuko Sasamoto.

 - A stray dog in Kuro's past with a similar appearance to Pooly, but with pointed ears. She had been a surrogate mother to Kuro as a baby for a brief time before he was taken. She is in the manga only.

 - An alternate form of Kuro which can be triggered by one of Dr. Go's machines or from extreme rage. He is a red and yellow more aggressive version of Kuro with large claws and teeth, he can also run much faster than Kuro but can also run out of fuel like his regular form, Kuro also seems to use a rocket launcher a lot in this form despite the gatling gun being his main weapon. He does not speak like normal Kuro, instead he angrily growls. This character was only featured in the anime and is voiced by Chika Sakamoto.

Media

Manga
The manga was originally released in issues of Comic BomBom from September 1997 until December 2001 with a total of 56 chapters. The chapters were then released across eleven volumes by Kodansha between 1998 and 2002. In Germany, Egmont Manga & Anime published the first three volumes. In France, Pika Édition published the entire series. It has been published in Indonesia by M&C Comics.

A sequel series,  was published from 2005 to 2006. Like the original, it has been published in Indonesia by M&C Comics.

Anime
Cyborg Kuro-chan was adapted into an anime series produced by Studio Bogey for TV Tokyo. The anime aired at 8:00am on Saturdays on TV Aichi affiliated networks from 2 October 1999 to 6 January 2001 for 66 episodes. A total of 26 episodes were to be made but production was extended until the end of March 2001, meaning that 78 episodes would be made instead. Only 66 of them were finished and aired as the producers Studio Bogey and Public & Basic declared bankruptcy in January 2001. Episode 66 was finished and aired after the bankruptcy and episodes 67-71 were promoted in Japan's Telemaga magazine despite never airing. Episodes 67-78 were replaced with rebroadcasts of older episodes.

The opening theme is Guruguru Kuro-chan by Lady Q, who also sung Damedame no Uta for Crayon Shin-chan. Two closing themes were created, those being Positive Vibration by Sister K, and Parapara Kuro-chan by Kyuu. The anime has been exported to several countries in Asia, Europe, and Africa. It has been broadcast on such channels including Spacetoon and Italia 1. The Italia 1 airing had an Italian opening that was sung by regular contributor Cristina D'Avena and Giorgio Vanni, titled "Roba da gatti". In India it aired titled Auto Cat. Naoki Tatsuta was the narrator, a characture of the creator of the manga.

In Japan the anime was released on VHS by Media Factory and Public & Basic (PIBI). The first series was of tapes were episodes 1-26. a 2nd series was released but was rental only. only the first 53 episodes were released after Public & Basic shut down. The series was later released in Japan on several video streaming services such as Amazon Video and U-NEXT. No DVDs or Blu-rays have been released in Japan, likely due to licensing issues regarding the defunct production companies. Other countries like Indonesia and China saw the episodes releasing on VCD. Episodes have been uploaded onto YouTube worldwide by Mondo World, owned by Grupa BB Media Ltd., Mondo own the distribution rights to the series in Europe and have shared episodes from several dubs they'e licensed.

There were also three Cyborg Kuro-chan CDs released, The first one (Guru Guru Kuro-chan) was a CD single released on 25 November 1999, featuring extended versions of the shows opening and ending. The second release (Cyborg Kuro-chan: strongest Uchimakuri Music Encyclopedia TV - Original Soundtrack) was released on 21 June 2000 and contained most of the tracks used in the anime. The third and final release (Cyborg Kuro-chan Gatling mix) was released on 18 November 2000 but unlike the other CD, the content of this CD mainly consists of remixes of tracks from the previous releases

Episodes

Other merchandise

Takara Tomy made toys based on the characters. In 1999 the company released posable figures of the characters which included bendable limbs and detachable weapons, they also made trading cards and figures of Kuro and Mi with action features. In 2000 the company release 4 vehicle toys based on the Battleborgs from episode 19 of the anime, Matatabi, Kuro, Mi and Cyborg Kuro were released. Tomy also made special boxed figures which contained many accessories including weapons. These were the last Kuro-chan toys released by Tomy.

Konami published video games based on the series. , a shoot 'em up, was released for the PlayStation on 28 November 2002. Official game guides were released for the Game Boy Color games. Taiwanese developer Lonaisoft also published a Windows game in 2002 under the title Pīlì Kù Yuè Māo; this was a 2D platform shooter loosely inspired by Mega Man.

Reception 
Christian Hess, writing for the German site Animepro, noted the "thin storyline" of the manga. Malindy Hetfield, writing for Splashcomics, felt that the artwork was closer to a child's drawing style than a manga style. She felt the parodies in the second volume were very funny, cautioning that one needed to become accustomed to the drawing style, and summed up the third volume as "You want hearty humor, wacky drawings, absolutely crazy characters and the greatest orgy of destruction that can be accommodated in 170 pages? Well then, let's go and buy!" Nicholas Demay compared the series with Samurai Pizza Cats, and described the drawing style as cartoonish, feeling that it supported the surreal tone of the manga, by reminding the reader that despite the "explosive ambiance" that this is a humorous series, intended for children. He felt that by the fourth volume, it was clear that Yokouchi intended to use simple characterisations (especially in Dr. Go's case), but felt that this was effective and heightened the contrast between the cuteness of the series and its depictions of mass destruction. Demay felt that the fifth volume, taking place in an alternate dimension, was a chance for Yokouchi to renew himself and to have a change of scenery, and noted that the backgrounds in this sequence are more detailed than usual. He felt that the story of Kuro-chan and Nana's true relationship was "cute and funny". Demay found the ninth volume "bleak", and hoped it was not a sign that the series was becoming tired, but was relieved to find that the tenth volume returned to humorous storylines. Demay was more prepared for the final volume's focus on action rather than comedy, but appreciated that the author "sprinkled through" many gags, which Demay felt Cyborg Kuro-chan would not be the same without, feeling that it was an honorable conclusion to the series.

The reviewer for Manga-News felt that the parodies of the early volumes quickly ran thin, and that the author's attempt to revive the series by adding in multiple characters left the reviewer confused. He felt that the later volumes' turn into emotional scenes and tragedy did not suit the series. He noted the Die Hard parody in the second volume, and felt that the references to Japanese culture in this volume were not adequately explained by Pika in the appendix. Despite this, he felt that it was accessible to a wide audience as most of the gags were visual gags. He described Kuro-chan as "a cross between Astroboy and Felix the Cat on acid". He felt that the translation sometimes altered jokes when they were clear in the original, for example, removing a reference to Pikachu. The reviewer for Manga-News noted that although the fifth volume concerned a more serious initial scenario and could be read independently of the others, that the storyline was more of the same silly humor and exaggerated violence. He felt that in the sixth volume, a "naive sentimentalism" clashed with the general ambiance of the series. In the seventh volume, there is a fight between Suzuki's students and Kuro in the desert, which the reviewer for Manga-News describes as inappropriate. In the ninth volume, the reviewer for Manga News felt that Chieko and Goro steal the stage from the main characters, and that the tenth volume was unfocused.

References

External links
 

1997 manga
1999 anime television series debuts
2005 manga
Children's manga
Comedy anime and manga
Fictional cats
Fictional cyborgs
Kodansha franchises
Konami franchises
Game Boy Color games
PlayStation (console) games
Film and television memes